Martial law in the United States refers to times in United States history in which in a region, state, city, or the whole United States was placed under the control of a military body. On a national level, both the US President and the US Congress have the power, within certain constraints, to impose martial law since both can be in charge of the militia. In each state, the governor has the power to impose martial law within the borders of the state. In the United States, martial law has been used in a limited number of circumstances, such as New Orleans during the Battle of New Orleans; after major disasters, such as the Great Chicago Fire of 1871, the 1906 San Francisco earthquake, or during riots, such as the Omaha race riot of 1919 or the 1920 Lexington riots; local leaders declared martial law to protect themselves from mob violence, such as Nauvoo, Illinois, during the Illinois Mormon War, or Utah during the Utah War; or in response to chaos associated with protests and rioting, such as the 1934 West Coast waterfront strike, in Hawaii after the Japanese attack on Pearl Harbor, and during the Civil Rights Movement in response to the Cambridge riot of 1963.

Legal basis 
The martial law concept in the United States is closely tied to the right of habeas corpus, which is, in essence, the right to a hearing and trial on lawful imprisonment, or more broadly, the supervision of law enforcement by the judiciary. The ability to suspend habeas corpus is related to the imposition of martial law. Article 1, Section 9 of the US Constitution states, "The Privilege of the Writ of Habeas Corpus shall not be suspended, unless when in Cases of Rebellion or Invasion the public Safety may require it." There have been many instances of the use of the military within the borders of the United States, such as during the Whiskey Rebellion and in the South during the Civil Rights Movement, but those acts are not tantamount to a declaration of martial law. Deployment of troops does not necessarily mean that the civil courts cannot function, which is one of the keys, as the US Supreme Court noted, to martial law.

In United States law, martial law is limited by several court decisions that were handed down between the American Civil War and World War II. In 1878, Congress passed the Posse Comitatus Act, which forbids US military involvement in domestic law enforcement without congressional approval.

Throughout history, martial law has been imposed at least 68 times in limited, usually local areas of the United States. Martial law was declared for these reasons: Twice for war or invasion, seven times for domestic war or insurrection, eleven times for riot or civil unrest, 29 times for labor dispute, four times for natural disaster and fifteen times for other reasons. Habeas corpus was suspended federally only once in 1863 during the Civil War.

History

American Revolution

As a result of the Boston Tea Party, Parliament passed the Massachusetts Government Act, one of the Intolerable Acts, which suppressed town meetings and assemblies, and imposed appointed government, tantamount to martial law.

New Orleans in War of 1812
During the War of 1812, US General Andrew Jackson imposed martial law in New Orleans, Louisiana before repulsing the British in the Battle of New Orleans. Martial law was also imposed in a four-mile radius around the vicinity. When word came of the end of the war, Jackson maintained martial law, contending that he had not gotten official word of the peace. A judge demanded habeas corpus for a man arrested for sedition. Rather than comply with the writ, Jackson had the judge arrested.

Nauvoo, Illinois, during the Illinois Mormon War (1843)

In 1843, Missouri sought to extradite Joseph Smith, the founder of Mormonism, for allegedly attempting to murder Missouri governor Lilburn Boggs. He escaped arrest with the help of members of his church, and was discharged on a writ of habeas corpus in the Municipal Court of Nauvoo, where he was mayor, even though it was outside the court's jurisdiction. People in the neighboring town of Carthage, Illinois, felt that Smith was abusing his position in order to avoid arrest. They requested that Governor Ford call out the militia to take Smith into custody, which Governor Ford declined to do. A group of ex-Mormons published a paper called the Nauvoo Expositor which detailed Smith's alleged abuse of power. Together with the Nauvoo City Council, Smith ordered the destruction of the Nauvoo Expositor. This caused an uproar in neighboring towns, which interpreted the order as an attack on the freedom of speech. Smith was charged with causing a riot, which the Nauvoo courts dismissed.  Neighboring cities raised money for a militia to go and capture Smith. Governor Ford arrived in Carthage and sent word to Smith that if he did not surrender, Ford would call out the militia. On June 18, Smith declared martial law in Nauvoo and called out the Nauvoo Legion, an organized city militia of about 5,000 men, to protect Nauvoo from outside violence.  Ford sent a group of men and abolished martial law. By this time, Smith had escaped into Iowa but was convinced by his supporters to return. He was arrested for treason against the state of Illinois for declaring martial law.  While awaiting trial in Carthage Jail, Smith was murdered by a mob.  In 1845, Nauvoo was stripped of its charter for abuse of authority. This led to a series of conflicts known as the Illinois Mormon War.

Utah War (1857)

Tension between Utah territory and the federal government was strained in 1857 due to the influence of theodemocracy in Governor Brigham Young's semi-theocratic government, Utah's rejection of federal appointees, and Utah's acceptance of polygamy. In 1857, President James Buchanan sent U.S. forces to the Utah Territory in what became known as the Utah War. The Mormons, fearing that the large U.S. military force had been sent to annihilate them, made preparations for defense. On 15 September, Young publicly declared martial law in Utah. It was widely circulated throughout the territory and was delivered by messenger to Col. Alexander with the approaching army. The most important provision forbade "all armed forces of every description from coming into this Territory, under any pretense whatsoever". It also commanded that "all the forces in said Territory hold themselves in readiness to march at a moment's notice to repel any and all such invasion". But more important to California- and Oregon-bound travelers was the third section that stated, "Martial law is hereby declared to exist in this Territory...and no person shall be allowed to pass or repass into, through or from this territory without a permit from the proper officer." Brigham Young ordered the people in Salt Lake City, Utah, to burn their homes and retreat south to Provo, Utah. Meanwhile, the Mormons harassed the approaching army. Eventually, Brigham Young was removed as governor and replaced by Alfred Cumming.

Baltimore (1861)

In April 1861, secessionists severed railroad links around Baltimore to prevent the passage of federal troops and materiel southward. Union general Benjamin Butler entered the city the following month and took over administration from civilian authorities, despite having no federal authority to do so.

Ex parte Milligan (1863)
On September 15, 1863, President Lincoln imposed Congressionally authorized martial law. The authorizing act allowed the President to suspend habeas corpus throughout the entire United States (which he had already done under his own authority on April 27, 1861). Lincoln imposed the suspension on "prisoners of war, spies, or aiders and abettors of the enemy," as well as on other classes of people, such as draft dodgers. The President's proclamation was challenged in Ex parte Milligan, 71 US 2 [1866]. The Supreme Court ruled that Lincoln's imposition of martial law (by way of suspension of habeas corpus) was unconstitutional in areas where the local courts were still in session.

The Great Chicago Fire (1871)

In response to the Great Chicago Fire of 1871, Chicago mayor Roswell B. Mason declared a state of martial law and placed General Philip Sheridan in charge of the city on October 9, 1871. After the fire was extinguished, there were no widespread disturbances and martial law was lifted within a few days.

Coeur d'Alene, Idaho (1892)
In 1892, in Coeur d'Alene, Idaho, striking mineworkers blew up a mill and shot at strike-breaking workers. The explosion leveled a four-story building and killed one person. The governor declared martial law. At the same time, a request was made for federal troops to back guardsmen. Over 600 people were arrested. The list was whittled down to two dozen ringleaders who were tried in the military court. While in prison, the mine workers formed a new union, the Western Federation of Miners.

San Francisco earthquake of 1906
Following the earthquake of 1906, the federal troops stationed in the Presidio were pressed into martial law service. They were posted throughout the city, and all dynamite was confiscated. The dynamite was used to destroy buildings in the path of fires to prevent the fires from spreading.

Colorado Coalfield War (1914 and 1917)
In 1914, the imposition of martial law climaxed during the Colorado Coalfield War. Dating back decades, the conflicts came to a head in Ludlow, Colorado, in 1913. The Colorado National Guard was called in to quell the strikers. For a time, the peace was kept, but it is reported that the make-up of the Guard stationed at the mines began to shift from impartial normal troops to companies of loyal mine guards. Clashes increased and the proclamation of martial law was made by the governor, eventually resulting in the Ludlow Massacre. President Wilson sent in federal troops, eventually ending the violence.

On August 19, 1917, the Spokane office of the Industrial Workers of the World (IWW, or Wobblies) was raided, leaders arrested, and martial law was declared. The military authority was the National Guard, controlled by the U.S. War Department. This occurred in reaction to a demand by IWW leader James Rowan that all prisoners of the "class war" (he meant Wobbly strikers and strike leaders involved in a statewide lumber strike) be released or Spokane would face a general strike. The repression of the democratic, radical union in Spokane and across the state took place in the context of the Wobbly-led loggers' and sawmill workers' ongoing strike for the eight-hour day and sanitary conditions in the camps. The IWW was militant, radical, vocal and consistently nonviolent. The larger context of the repression of the union was war hysteria, combined with employer opposition to union demands. The nationwide suppression of the IWW during the war involved physical violence, vandalism, and the imprisonment of hundreds of union members and leaders.

West Virginia Coal Wars (1920-1921)
During the events of the West Virginia Coal Wars (1920–1921), martial law was declared in the state of West Virginia. At the behest of Governor Cornwell, federal troops had been dispatched to Mingo County to deal with the striking miners. The army officer in charge acted, ostensibly, under the Suspension Clause of Article I of the United States Constitution (selectively; accounts show that he jailed only union miners), and did not allow assembly of any kind. If his soldiers found any union miners, they immediately took them and imprisoned them. The jails filled up so quickly that he had to release miners. As it went, miners were arrested, jailed, and released without any sort of trial. After a time, when the trial of Sid Hatfield began, the military occupation and "veritable military dictatorship" (Governor Cornwell) of the army officer ended. Many of the miners were not released from jail. It was only the first of three times that federal troops would be called to quiet the miners in the West Virginia Mine War.

Minneapolis, Minnesota (1934)
In 1934, Minnesota Governor Floyd B. Olson placed the city of Minneapolis under martial law and deployed the National Guardsmen of the 34th Infantry Division due to escalating violence during the Minneapolis general strike of 1934 after Bloody Friday when police opened fire on picketers.

On July 26, and these deaths of protesters at the hands of the police, Farmer-Labor governor Olson declared martial law and mobilized four thousand National Guardsmen of the 34th Infantry. Following this mobilization, there was no further loss of life.

Between July 26 and August 1, the National Guard began issuing operating permits to truck drivers, and engaging in roving patrols, curfews, and security details. On August 1, National Guard troops seized strike headquarters and placed arrested union leaders in a stockade at the state fairgrounds in Saint Paul. The next day, the headquarters were restored to the union and the leaders released from the stockade, as the National Guard carried out a token raid on the Citizens Alliance headquarters.

The union appealed to the Central Labor Union for a general strike and the governor issued an ultimatum that he would stop all trucks by midnight, August 5, if there was no settlement. Nevertheless, by August 14, there were thousands of trucks operating under military permits. Although the strike was gravely weakened by martial law and economic pressure, union leaders made it clear that it would continue.

On August 21, a federal mediator got acceptance of a settlement proposal from A. W. Strong, head of the Citizens Alliance, incorporating the union's major demands. The settlement was ratified and the back of employer resistance to unionization in Minneapolis was broken.

San Francisco, California (1934)
In 1934, California Governor Frank Merriam placed the docks of San Francisco under martial law, citing "riots and tumult" resulting from a dock worker's strike. The governor threatened to place the entire city under martial law. The National Guard was called in to open the docks, and a citywide institution of martial law was averted when goods began to flow. The guardsmen were empowered to make arrests and to then try detainees or turn them over to the courts.

Territory of Hawaii in World War II (1941-1944)

During World War II (1939–1945) what is now the State of Hawaii was held under martial law from December 7, 1941, to October 24, 1944, following the Japanese attack on Pearl Harbor. After the war, one of the federal judges for the islands, Judge J. Frank McLaughln, condemned the conduct of martial law, saying, "Gov. Poindexter declared lawfully martial law but the Army went beyond the governor and set up that which was lawful only in conquered enemy territory namely, military government which is not bound by the Constitution. And they ... threw the Constitution into the discard and set up a military dictatorship."

Russell County, Alabama (1954–55)

Alabama Governor Gordon Persons placed Russell County under martial law in June 1954 due to the pervasive influence of organized crime gangs. The National Guard assumed law enforcement duties in the county for the remainder of the year, shut down gang-controlled establishments, and oversaw the first lawful elections in decades.

Freedom Riders (1961)

On May 21, 1961, Governor Patterson of Alabama declared martial law "as a result of outside agitators coming into Alabama to violate our laws and customs" which had led to "outbreaks of lawlessness and mob action." The "outside agitators" were "Freedom Riders", peaceful civil rights activists challenging the already-illegal racial segregation in the South.

2007 National Defense Authorization Act
H.R. 5122, also known as the John Warner National Defense Authorization Act for Fiscal Year 2007 was a bill passed in the United States Congress on September 29, 2006, and signed by President George W. Bush on October 17, 2006, becoming Public Law 109-364. In addition to allocating funding for the armed forces, it also gave the president the power to declare martial law and to take command of the National Guard units of each state without the consent of state governors.

On April 2, 2007, US Senate held hearings about recent changes to the Insurrection Act of 1807, (in Sec 1072 of Defense Authorization Act) where Sen. Patrick Leahy of Vermont sought to reverse the 2006 amendments to the Insurrection Act, which had given the US President new powers to use military for domestic disturbance, terrorism, insurrection, etc, and even  changed the name  from "Insurrection Act" to "Enforcement of the Laws to Restore Public Order." In the Senate Hearing, Senator Kit Bond testified:  "Mr. Chairman, the measure that was included in last year's congressional Defense Authorization Act I think was ill-conceived, unnecessary, and dumb. Even some of the members of the SASC who should have did not know about it. But this is an influential panel, and you know how it has changed the old law, and we now know that all 50 of our Nation's Governors, Adjutants General, and local law enforcement are opposed to it. Nobody knows where it came from. Allowing the President to invoke the Act and declare martial law where public order breaks down as a result of natural disaster, epidemic, terrorist attack, is very ambiguous and gives him broad authority potentially to usurp the role of the Governors".

Based on opposition by Congress, individual state Governors, law enforcement community, and absence of clarity on who even introduced these changes, the 'Enforcement of the Laws to Restore Public Order' law was repealed on January 28, 2008, (based on Sen. Pat Leahy's S. 513 proposal to repeal) and the previous Insurrection Act was restored.  As of 2020, the Insurrection Act of 1807 still applies in limiting a US President's ability under Title 10 to federalize National Guard troops for martial law purposes.

References

Further reading
 Macomb, Alexander, Major General of the United States Army, The Practice of Courts-Martial, (New York: Harper & Brothers, 1841) 154 pages.
 Macomb, Alexander, Major General of the United States Army, A Treatise on Martial Law, and Courts-Martial as Practiced in the United States. (Charleston: J. Hoff, 1809), republished (New York: Lawbook Exchange, 2007). .
 
 The Concise Oxford Dictionary of Politics. Edited by Iain McLean and Alistair McMillan, Oxford University Press, 2004.
 Black's Law Dictionary: Definitions of the Terms and Phrases of American and English Jurisprudence, Ancient and Modern. Henry Campbell Black. St. Paul: West Pub. Co., 1979.

 Emergency laws in the United States
United States
 Military law